Remus Ghiurițan (born 7 September 1919, date of death unknown) was a Romanian football defender and manager.

International career
Remus Ghiurițan played one game at international level for Romania in a friendly which ended with a 7–2 loss against Hungary.

Honours
Rapid București
Cupa României: 1940–41, 1941–42

Notes

References

External links
Remus Ghiurițan manager profile at Labtof.ro

1919 births
Year of death missing
Romanian footballers
Romania international footballers
Association football defenders
Liga I players
Liga II players
CFR Cluj players
FC CFR Timișoara players
FC Rapid București players
Romanian football managers
FC Rapid București managers
People from Zalău